St. Charles is a city in DuPage and Kane counties in the U.S. state of Illinois. Per the 2020 census, the population was 33,081. The official city slogan is "Pride of the Fox", after the Fox River that runs through the center of town. St. Charles is part of a tri-city area along with Geneva and Batavia, all western suburbs of similar size and socioeconomic condition.

History

Early history
St. Charles was the location of the Native American community for the chief of the Pottawatomie that inhabited the area.  A city park overlooking the river was dedicated to this Native American past. After the Black Hawk War in 1832, the entire area of the Fox Valley was opened to American settlement.  Evan Shelby and William Franklin staked the first claim in what is now St. Charles in 1833.  They came back in 1834 with their families from Indiana, and were joined by over a dozen other families later that year. The township was initially known as Charleston, but this name was already taken by the downstate city of Charleston, Illinois, so the name of St. Charles (suggested by S. S. Jones, a lawyer) was adopted in 1839. St. Charles became incorporated as a city February 9, 1839, and reincorporated October 17, 1874 (under the 1870 Illinois Constitution).

Underground Railroad
Widespread claims of slavery-era Underground Railroad stations operating in St. Charles homes, complete with tunnels and false doorways, have not been historically substantiated. Even so, an active abolitionist group was operating in St. Charles around this time, called the Kane County Anti-Slavery Society. The Society was founded in 1842 and had about 180 members at its peak. The most plausible connection to the Underground Railroad in the town is the Wheeler House, built in St. Charles in 1837.

Transportation history
St. Charles was a very isolated place early on in its existence. The village was located three days away from Chicago, and the Fox River was not navigable for large boats. By the 1850s, St. Charles had begun construction of a plank road to Sycamore but turned down an offer by the Galena and Chicago Union Railroad to construct a line through the town, which was eventually built in nearby Elgin. Lack of regional connections in the early years kept the town relatively small. St. Charles was without a railroad until 1871 when a branch line from Geneva was constructed, and was without a direct connection to Chicago until the 1880s with the coming of the Chicago Great Western Railway.

Streetcar lines along the Fox River between Elgin and Aurora were built through the city in 1896, operated by the Aurora, Elgin and Fox River Electric company. A direct automobile route to Chicago, which eventually became Route 64 (Main Street), was constructed in 1920. Four Illinois state routes, including Routes 64, 38 (Lincoln Highway), 25 (5th Avenue), and 31 (2nd Street) now run through the city. Two major Kane County roads also cut through the city; Randall Road on the west side and Kirk Road on the east side.

Immigration history
St. Charles has attracted groups of European immigrants, including from Ireland and Sweden during the 1840s and 1850s, and later from Belgium and Lithuania.

COVID-19 pandemic
On , the Kane County Health Department ordered Smithfield Foods to close its meat processing plant because of the COVID-19 pandemic, a local instance of the pandemic's effects on the meat industry in the United States.

Geography

The Fox River runs through downtown. Potawatomie Park, which sits on the river, is the largest park in St. Charles and a popular destination for both tourists and tri-city area citizens.

Demographics
As of the 2020 census there were 33,081 people, 12,342 households, and 8,767 families residing in the city. The racial makeup of the city was 81.17% White, 1.75% African American, 0.39% Native American, 4.43% Asian, 0.02% Pacific Islander, 4.56% from other races, and 7.68% from two or more races. Hispanic or Latino of any race were 11.26% of the population.

There were 12,342 households, out of which 52.26% had children under the age of 18 living with them, 57.82% were married couples living together, 10.45% had a female householder with no husband present, and 28.97% were non-families. 23.46% of all households were made up of individuals, and 11.55% had someone living alone who was 65 years of age or older. The average household size was 3.11 and the average family size was 2.60.

The city's age distribution consisted of 21.5% under the age of 18, 10.1% from 18 to 24, 22.7% from 25 to 44, 29.6% from 45 to 64, and 16.3% who were 65 years of age or older. The median age was 41.3 years. For every 100 females, there were 96.6 males. For every 100 females age 18 and over, there were 94.4 males.

The median income for a household in the city was $102,414, and the median income for a family was $124,032. Males had a median income of $70,051 versus $36,012 for females. The per capita income for the city was $50,467. About 1.8% of families and 3.3% of the population were below the poverty line, including 1.9% of those under age 18 and 4.2% of those age 65 or over.

Note: the US Census treats Hispanic/Latino as an ethnic category. This table excludes Latinos from the racial categories and assigns them to a separate category. Hispanics/Latinos can be of any race.

Government and infrastructure

State government
The Illinois Youth Center St. Charles (IYC St. Charles), a juvenile correctional facility of the Illinois Department of Juvenile Justice, is in St. Charles. It opened in December 1904.

Education
The public education system in St. Charles is operated by the Community Unit School District 303, which currently has thirteen elementary schools: Anderson, Bell-Graham, Corron, Davis, Ferson Creek, Fox Ridge, Lincoln, Munhall, Norton Creek, Wasco, and Wild Rose. Also including Davis Primary (K-2), and Richmond Intermediate (3-5) split elementary schools. There are two middle schools: Thompson and Wredling; and two high schools: St. Charles East High School, and St. Charles North High School. The Glenwood School for Boys and Girls has a campus in St. Charles known as the Rathje Campus named for the Frank C. Rathje family. St. Patrick Catholic School opened its doors in 1930 and previously served about 500 students at the downtown campus. Saint Patrick Catholic school is downtown campus is now a preschool.  The school opened another location off Randall Road which serves over 500 students.  St. Charles is part of Community College District 509 which is served by Elgin Community College.

Culture

Pottawatomie Park is the home of the Kane County Fair in July, the Kane County Flea Market the first Sunday and preceding Saturday of every month, and the annual Dragon Boat festival and family event during the second weekend of June. Lincoln Park, in downtown St. Charles, serves as the central location for the Scarecrow Festival in October. St. Charles is home to the Fox Valley Concert Band.

St. Charles is home to the Arcada theatre, a notable attraction within the Fox River valley, where many famous performers have appeared including Martin Short, Joan Rivers, and Paul Anka. Local theatres include Steel Beam Theatre, the Vero Voce Theater & School of Performing Arts, and Kane Repertory Theatre.

Historic Hotel Baker, which opened in 1928, is a symbolic representation of the rich history of downtown St. Charles.

Downtown St. Charles was named one of the region's "Top 10" by the Chicago Tribune for fine dining, arts and entertainment, recreational opportunities, unique shopping, and a lively nighttime personality.

Family Circle magazine named St. Charles #1 in its 2011 Annual Survey of Best Towns and Cities for families. The comprehensive survey included communities from across the country and is featured in the magazine's August 2011 issue. The communities in the magazine's annual roundup of perfect places to call home combine affordable housing, good neighbors, green spaces, strong public school systems, and giving spirits.

The St. Charles History Museum maintains a small museum of community artifacts in a historic former Texaco service station that was originally built in 1928 on Main Street.

The St. Charles Public Library is nationally ranked among the best libraries in the U.S. and has earned a "three star" rating in the 2010 Library Journal Index. Located near downtown St. Charles, the library has a large collection of print materials, as well as DVDs, CDs, downloadable content, online research databases, and a genealogy collection. Programs and activities for children and adults are offered. Outreach Services can arrange special delivery options for those who have special circumstances, such as visual, mobility or hearing impairments. The Friends of the Library sponsors spring and fall book sales each year.

In 2008, as part of a promotional effort by a local water gardening company, St. Charles named itself the water garden capital of the world.

St. Charles is home to the Q Center, a  conference site.  Originally built as a Catholic Women's Liberal Arts College, St. Dominic College, it later became Arthur Andersen's Center for Professional Education.  It is now used by Accenture, and hosts meetings, conferences and executive learning for Fortune 500 companies, associations and social, military, education, religious, and fraternal organizations from all over the world.

St. Charles hosts an annual Scarecrow Fest, featuring 100+ handmade scarecrows.

Economy

Top employers
According to St. Charles' 2016 Comprehensive Annual Financial Report, the top employers in the city are:

History 
Piano-making was a major industry in St. Charles in the first three decades of the 20th century.

Employing up to 500 workers: 

On , the St. Charles factory closed, having been sold to the W.H. Howell company, which made furniture there until 1980.  The building reopened in May 1986 as the indoor Piano Factory Outlet Mall, whose outlet stores included Corning, American Tourister, Carter's, Pfalzgraff, and Anchor Hocking. It was foreclosed upon and closed in 1997. The building was razed in September 2000 to make way for a residential development; the site is now occupied by condominiums and mixed-use buildings.

In popular culture
St. Charles is featured in the 2011 American independent horror film Munger Road.

Brief scene crossing the downtown St. Charles Fox River bridge in an early Brendan Fraser movie With Honors.

The 2020 documentary A Secret Love follows the story of a couple who lived in St. Charles for decades.

Filming for an upcoming David Fincher movie called The Killer is currently taking place in St. Charles.

Notable people

 Edward J. Baker, wealthy benefactor; provided the funding for several buildings in St. Charles; born and raised in St. Charles
 Robert F. Casey, Illinois state legislator and lawyer, practiced law in St. Charles.
 Chrissy Chlapecka, singer, songwriter, activist
 Frantz Hunt Coe, physician, public official, and educator
 Ethan Cutkosky, actor
 John F. Farnsworth, Union Army general and U.S. congressman; friend of Abraham Lincoln; lived in St. Charles
 Dennis E. Fitch, off-duty pilot who helped saved lives in the crash of United Airlines Flight 232; died in St. Charles
 Helmut Jahn (1940–2021), architect and member of the postmodern group of architects dubbed the Chicago Seven. He was a St. Charles resident at the time of his death.
 Dallas Jenkins, actor
Marci Jobson, born and raised in St Charles, professional soccer player and coach
 Jenny McCarthy, lives in St. Charles, actress
 Tera Moody, long-distance runner
 Karen Morrison-Comstock, Miss Illinois USA 1974, Miss USA 1974
 Michael J. Nelson, comedian and writer; (Mystery Science Theater 3000)
 Dellora A. Norris, civic philanthropist
 David Purcey, left-handed relief pitcher for the Toronto Blue Jays, Oakland Athletics, Detroit Tigers, Philadelphia Phillies and Chicago White Sox
 Matt Reynolds, relief pitcher for the Arizona Diamondbacks
 Matthew Shiltz Quarterback for the Hamilton Tiger-Cats in the Canadian Football League
 Donnie Wahlberg, lives in St. Charles, entertainer
 Brian Wilson, singer and member of the Beach Boys; lived in St. Charles
 Chris Witaske, actor
 Rick Wohlhuter, 1976 800m Olympic bronze medalist; born in St. Charles
 Randy Wright, former professional football quarterback, born and raised in St. Charles

See also

Tri-Cities, Illinois

References

External links
 City of St. Charles official website

 
Populated places established in 1834
Cities in DuPage County, Illinois
Cities in Kane County, Illinois
Cities in Illinois
Populated places on the Underground Railroad
1834 establishments in Illinois